Muragacha railway station is a railway station under Sealdah railway division of Eastern Railway system. It is situated beside Nakashipara Road in Muragacha on the Krishnanagar–Lalgola lines in Nadia in the Indian state of West Bengal. Few EMU and Lalgola passengers trains are passing through Muragacha railway station.

Electrification
The 128 km long Krishnanagar– stretch including Muragacha railway station was electrified in 2007 for EMU services.

References

Sealdah railway division
Railway stations in Nadia district
Kolkata Suburban Railway stations